Brighton Town Hall is a historic town hall located at Brighton, Franklin County, New York.  It was built in 1914 and is a modest, one story American Craftsman style building measuring 35 feet wide and 58 feet deep.  It rests on a fieldstone foundation with exposed cobblestone piers at the front.  It features three telescoping, graduated gables with exposed rafters and decorative braces.  The interior contains a large, 30 feet by 34 feet meeting hall.  It was designed by architect Benjamin A. Muncil.

It was listed on the National Register of Historic Places in 2003.

References

City and town halls on the National Register of Historic Places in New York (state)
Government buildings completed in 1914
Buildings and structures in Franklin County, New York
American Craftsman architecture in New York (state)
National Register of Historic Places in Franklin County, New York